Abednego Feehi Okoe Amartey, (born July 26, 1967) is a Ghanaian academic who is currently the Vice Chancellor of the University of Professional Studies, Accra, Ghana. He is a professor in Management.

Early life and education 
Amartey had his secondary school education at St. Thomas Aquinas Senior High School in Accra and Prempeh College where he obtained his Ordinary Level Certificate in 1986 and Advanced Level Certificate in 1988 respectively  He further obtained Bachelor of Arts (Economics with Sociology), Master in Business Administration (Marketing Option) and Master of Philosophy in Marketing, all from the University of Ghana. He also holds a professional marketing qualification from the Chartered Institute of Marketing UK. In addition, he holds a Doctorate of Business Administration from the SMC University in Switzerland.

Academic career 
Amartey is a professor in Management  Professor Okoe has occupied several positions in the Department of Marketing, Faculty of Management at the University. In 2006, he was appointed as the Head of the CIM Unit and in 2008 got promoted to the position of Head of Marketing Department. After successfully serving two terms as Head of Department, he was appointed as the Dean of the Faculty of Management Studies in September, 2014. His meteoric rise continued when exactly a year later he was appointed as the Acting Pro-Vice Chancellor of the University.

The Governing Council of the University of Professional Studies approved his promotion from the rank of a Senior Lecturer to Associate Professor in Management in the Department of Marketing of the University effective December, 2015 and now serves as the substantive Pro Vice Chancellor of the University. He has 21 publications in reputable and ranked journals. Currently, he serves as the vice president of the consumer advocacy center, Ghana.

Personal and family life
Amartey is a Christian. He's married and has 3 children.

Honours and awards

 Conferred with a Chartered Institute of Marketing, Ghana (CIMG) Fellow (2018)
Voted the 'Most Respected CEO' in the education sector at the Ghana Industry CEO Awards (2018)
Inducted into the maiden Bachelor of Marketing Students in 2013
 He won the Emerald Literati Network Awards for Excellence in 2016. The event was held in Anaheim, California

References 

1967 births
Living people
Vice-Chancellors of universities in Ghana
Prempeh College alumni
University of Ghana alumni
People from Greater Accra Region